Katie Alice Greer (born 1989) is an American artist, songwriter, performer and producer. She was the lead singer of Priests and released her first solo album in 2022.

Greer was born in New Baltimore, Michigan. She moved to Washington D.C. in 2006 to study at the American University, from where she graduated with a degree in political science. In 2020 she relocated to Los Angeles.

In 2012 she formed the post-punk band Priests together with Daniele Daniele (drums), G.L. Jaguar (guitar) and Taylor Mulitz (bass), with herself on vocals. Their 2017 full length debut Nothing Feels Natural made several of that year’s best album release lists. In 2019 Priests broke up.

Also in 2012, she and the other members of Priests founded the record label Sister Polygon Records, initially as a platform for the band's own releases. The label has since been home to a constellation of emerging acts from the DC, Maryland and Virginia area.

During 2012-2014 she also collaborated with Ian Svenonius as a vocalist on his project Chain & the Gang. Results from the collaboration were the two albums In Cool Blood (2012) and Minimum Rock N Roll (2014). She has also directed music videos, both for Priests as well as for other artists.

Greer has been releasing solo material since 2015, under her acronym KAG. Contrasting with Priests, her solo material has been described as more lo-fi art pop. In 2018 she released a full cover of Dixie Chicks 1999 album Fly, the reason for this being on the one hand that she describes herself as a "huge Dixie Chicks fan", on the other that she wanted to get out of her creative comfort zone.

When Priests broke up in 2019, she moved to Los Angeles, just before the pandemic outbreak. During the pandemic she released a series of EPs but also began work on her first full solo album.

In April 2022, Greer released Barbarism, a full length album which she wrote, performed, produced and mixed herself, noting that "Recording, for me, is like an instrument, and definitely the one I’m most proficient in".  The album title alludes to "socialism or barbarism", a phrase used by Rosa Luxemburg. The album marks a strong break from the post-punk of Priests. One reviewer summarizes the album as "caught between reality and nightmare, balancing dissonant soundscapes against an eerie, self-possessed sense of calm" and concludes "Falling into her [Greer's] world, it’s hard not to be possessed in return". Another reviewer describes it as "a wonderfully singular vision full of conviction, vulnerability, fear, fascination, and rage. The songs themselves feel like collages, layers of sound chopped up and glued together in ambiguous shapes." Rolling Stone writes "It’s trippy, radical, weirdly life-affirming music, like nothing else Greer has ever made."

Discussing the many sources of inspiration for the album Greer mentions not only musicians such as Erykah Badu and Karuna Khyal but also artists such as Alex Prager, Hito Steyerl and Julian Rosenfeldt.

As an artist, she has "cultivated a reputation as a dynamic performer and an astute conveyor of both abstract and didactic cultural critiques". The latter includes spoken and written commentaries, including essays and talks for NPR and the Future Of Music Policy Summit, among others, and often exploring "the politics of community… DIY, grassroots, based on mutual aid and solidarity".

Discography

References

External links 

  – Official Site
 Official Bandcamp
 

1989 births
21st-century American singers
American women singer-songwriters
Art pop musicians
American women in electronic music
Women punk rock singers
Living people